The Selke Valley Trail is a 67 km long footpath in the Harz mountains of Germany. It begins at the  Selke Valley Railway station in Stiege and follows the River Selke in places. Along the route lie the villages of Güntersberge, Straßberg, Silberhütte, Alexisbad, Mägdesprung, Meisdorf, Ballenstedt, Gernrode, Bad Suderode and Quarmbeck. The end of the Selketalstieg is in Carl-Ritter-Straße in Quedlinburg. In 2006 the footpath was established by the Harz Tourist Association (Harzer Verkehrsverband).

References 

Hiking trails in Germany
Harz